Oranit is an Israeli settlement and local council located in the Seam Zone of the West Bank, abutting the Green Line. It is surrounded by Horshim forest to the west, Rosh HaAyin and Kfar Qasim to the southwest, Sha'arei Tikva to the east, and Khirbet Abu Salman to the northeast.

The international community considers Israeli settlements illegal under international law, though Israel disputes this.

History
According to ARIJ, Israel confiscated land from two nearby Palestinian villages in order to construct Oranit: most of the land was taken from Azzun Atma, while 6 dunams from ‘Izbat Salman.

In April 1983, the Israeli government approved the establishment of Oranit, one of three settlements planned for "western Samaria".

According to Amnesty International the majority of the land of the neighboring Palestinian village of 'Izbat Salman was lost when Oranit was established, with most of the remainder being effectively lost when the West Bank barrier was built to encompass Oranit and enough surrounding land for future expansion of the settlement. The UN Relief and Works Agency for Palestine Refugees in the Near East has estimated that three Palestinian villages in the vicinity lost 3,000 dunams of land with the creation of Oranit settlement. Thirty Palestinian farmers were initially given access to their farmland through the gates of the settlement. This right was soon withdrawn for "security reasons" and the settlement has since expanded onto this Palestinian farmland.

In 1985, the first residents moved in. In 1990, Oranit achieved local council status. In 2009, Israeli prime minister Benjamin Netanyahu imposed a 10-month freeze on construction in Oranit and other Israeli settlements in the West Bank. Building inspectors of the Israeli military's civil administration issued a stop-work order, sending home a crew of Palestinian laborers who had been employed at a building site in Oranit.

According to Zvika Ma-Yafit, former mayor of Oranit, the town maintains good relations with nearby Kafr Qasim and the two towns have cooperated on environmental projects such as the development of a joint sewage system. Many residents of Kafr Qasim work in Oranit as gardeners and handymen. He says the motive for moving to Oranit is not ideological but quality of life.

Demographics
According to a 2009 survey, the population is young and evenly divided between men and women. Around 15% of the population is Orthodox, two-thirds of whom live in the town's religious neighborhood. Oranit ranked 8 out of 10 on the Israeli socio-economic scale.

Education and culture

In an educational project at MultiCenter, a computer center at Park Afek industrial zone, Jewish and Arab youngsters from Oranit, Rosh Ha'ayin and Kafr Qasim created a computer model for a virtual city of coexistence. According to the project director, the children learn about each other's language and culture, discuss strategies for promoting tolerance and avoiding violence, and use a program developed by MultiCenter to create a virtual dream city,
complete with a map, logo and charter.

Community facilities include a public swimming pool and tennis courts.

Notable residents
 Shai Piron (b. 1965), Israeli politician (Yesh Atid) and former Minister of Education

References

External links
  

Israeli settlements in the West Bank
Local councils in Israel
Mixed Israeli settlements
Populated places established in 1985
1985 establishments in the Israeli Civil Administration area